The Australian National Judo Championships are the highest level of judo competition in Australia. The championships are held annually by Judo Australia, and qualified domestic and overseas judoka compete in their respective categories as representatives of their home states or countries. Both the women's and men's championships began in 1956, with the championships being held in Wollongong, New South Wales between 2012 and 2015.

Weight classes
There have been a number of changes to the weight divisions over the life of the championships.  There are currently 8 weight classes for each gender, based on the official International Judo Federation weight divisions.

Australian Champions – Women

Australian Champions – Men

Most championships

References
 2009 National Judo Championships Program, Bluestar Print, Canberra, 2009 (all Championships up to 2008)
 https://web.archive.org/web/20100704231153/http://www.ausjudo.com.au/jfa/images/managed/fnwATtZB8BLUhytEliEriTWIxn7ggQxX.pdf, retrieved 18 June 2010
 https://web.archive.org/web/20120222001557/http://www.judotv.com.au/, retrieved 12 June 2011
 https://assets.imgstg.com/assets/console/document/documents/2012%20Nationals%20Results.pdf, retrieved 12 June 2012
 https://assets.imgstg.com/assets/console/document/documents/2013%20National%20Championships%20Full%20Results.pdf, retrieved 18 June 2013
 https://assets.imgstg.com/assets/console/document/documents/20140608103856Senior_completed.pdf, retrieved 12 June 2014

Judo competitions
Judo
Judo in Australia
Judo competitions in Australia